George Randall (1895–1955) was an Australian actor with extensive experience on stage and radio.

References

External links
George Randall at National Film and Sound Archive

Australian male radio actors
1895 births
1955 deaths
Australian male stage actors
20th-century Australian male actors
Place of birth missing